Xylotoles griseus, the fig longhorn, is a species of beetle in the family Cerambycidae. It was described by Johan Christian Fabricius in 1775, originally under the genus Saperda. It is known from New Zealand where it feeds on elm trees. It is widespread and common in New Zealand, breeding on many species of trees. It was found in the UK for the first time when a number of adults were taken from a recently felled fig tree at Westward Ho!, Devon in 2014.

Varieties
 Xylotoles griseus var. maculosus Broun, 1886
 Xylotoles griseus var. submicans Broun, 1921

References

Fabricius
Dorcadiini
Beetles described in 1775
Beetles of New Zealand
Endemic fauna of New Zealand
Endemic insects of New Zealand